Mr. Bogus is an animated American television series created by Peter Keefe, directed and produced by Tom Burton with Claudia Burton of Zodiac Entertainment, which aired in syndication from September 28, 1991 to November 22, 1993. The show also ran in 1998 on Fox Family Channel. It is loosely based on the French / Belgian clay animation series of shorts simply titled, Bogus. Each episode is separated into two distinct parts, one using mostly traditional cel-based animation and another using what the show is based on, which are 42 localized versions of the 300 original clay animation shorts (either 8 claymation shorts per episode, 336 in total). Characters often walked around on a kitchen counter having various adventures with common household items.

The show has also aired on Channel 4 and The Children's Channel in the UK, on Welsh language channel S4C as "Mr. Bogel" in Wales, as well as on Telefutura program block, Toonturama as "El Señor Bogus" in United States with Spanish-dubbed, on TV Globo in Brazil, on TVN in Chile, ANT1 in Greece, on Arutz HaYeladim in Israel as "Mr. Bluffer", on Max in Australia, on Fun Channel in the Middle East, on M-Net in South Africa, on Bahrain 55 in Bahrain, on TV2 in New Zealand, on ABS-CBN in The Philippines, on Channel 5 in Singapore, on Channel 2 in Jordan, on Dubai 33 in the UAE, on Canal J in France, on Tele 3 and TVP3 in Poland, on kabel eins in Germany, on MBC C&I in South Korea, on TV3 in Sweden, on PTV4 in Finland, on Saudi 2 in Saudi Arabia, on TV3 in Malaysia and on TV6 in Russia.

Summary

Cel-animated version

In the cel-animated version, Mr. Bogus is a yellow gremlin-like creature living in the walls of the suburban home of Tommy Anybody, alternately creating problems and/or accidentally solving them. Sometimes Bogus adventures to his own world, Bogusland, a distorted alternate dimension of curved and warped perspective and bizarre plots. He often encountered the feared dust bunnies known on the show as Dirt Dudes.

Clay animated version
The clay animated version is a series of shorts that are localized versions of several episodes of the 1987 French / Belgian series of shorts simply titled Bogus, and served as lead-ins to commercial breaks. They were originally produced by Antenne 2, Y.C. Aligator Film and Chin Chin Production, and were created by Michel Durieux and Ghislain Honoré. They were first aired on October 30, 1987, and reran from October 2, 1988 to February 1990. There were 300 episodes created, but only 42 were localized and used in the 42 episodes of the cel-animated version.

In its original 1987 plot, the male house owner woke up by his alarm clock, drank coffee, took his keys and left from home to work. But during his absence, the house wasn't alone. Bogus, a funny little yellow character, fate because of his hiding place and saw a short and fun adventures with surrounding objects. He clumsily discovers the world around them in different rooms of the house (such as the bathroom and the attic) and always provoked laughter from the viewers.

In the 1991 localized version, the original voice-acting and background music were changed to Cam Clarke's voice-acting and the instrumental version of the cel-animated version's opening theme.

Episodes 

Season 1 (1991)
"Meet Mr. Bogus" (September 28, 1991)
"Class Clown Bogus" (October 5, 1991)
"A Day at the Office" (October 12, 1991)
"Et Tu, Brattus?" (October 19, 1991)
"Shop Around the Clock" (October 26, 1991)
"Beach Blanket Bogus" (November 2, 1991)
"Bogus in Wilderland" (November 9, 1991)
"No Snooze is Good News" (November 16, 1991) 
"Hipster Tripster" (November 23, 1991)
"Museum Madness" (December 7, 1991)
"Lights, Camera, Bogus" (December 14, 1991)
"Bogus in Bogus Land" (December 21, 1991)
"Good Sport Bogus" (December 28, 1991)

Season 2 (1992)
"Computer Intruder" (September 27, 1992)
"Babysitting Bogus" (October 4, 1992)
"Bogunda, Bogetta & Bogus" (October 11, 1992)
"Bookstore Bogus" (October 18, 1992)
"Bad Luck Bogus" (October 25, 1992)
"Totally Bogus Video" (November 1, 1992)
"Bogus Private Eye" (November 8, 1992)
"Bogus to the Rescue" (November 15, 1992)
"Mr. Bogus' Sci-Fi Fest" (November 22, 1992)
"Terror Tot in Bogusland" (November 29, 1992)
"Roam Away from Home" (December 6, 1992)
"Bugboy Bogus" (December 13, 1992)
"Springtime for Bogus" (December 20, 1992)

Season 3 (1993)
"Nightmare on Bogus Street" (October 27, 1993)
"B-TV" (October 28, 1993)
"Waterboy Bogus" (November 3, 1993)
"Kung Fu Camp Out" (November 4, 1993)
"Battle Action Bogus" (November 5, 1993)
"Secret Agent Bogus" (November 8, 1993)
"Super Bogus Flies Again" (November 9, 1993)
"Is There a Bogus in the House?" (November 10, 1993)
"The Bogus Invasion" (November 11, 1993)
"Fun Park Follies" (November 14, 1993)
"Buff-Tuff Bogie" (November 15, 1993)
"Once Upon a Bogus Time" (November 16, 1993)
"Brainy Bogus" (November 17, 1993)
"Mega Star Madness" (November 18, 1993)
"Totally Bogus Daydream" (November 21, 1993)
"Baseball Bogie" (November 22, 1993)
"Hospital Play" (November 29, 1993)

Alternative titles 
 مستر بوغِس (Mistar Boghes) (Arabic Title)
 Majstor Fantaz (Croatian Title)
 Monsieur Bogus (French Title)
 Jetzt kommt Bogus! (German Title)
 Μίστερ Μπόγκους (Greek Title)
 מר בלופר (Hebrew Title)
 보거스는 내 친구 (Bogeoseuneun nae chingu) (Korean Title)
 Pan Boguś (Polish Title)
 Senhor Bogus (Portuguese Title)
 Мистер Богус (Mister Bogus) (Russian Title)
 Gospodin Mufljuz (Serbian Title)                                                                                                                     
 Herr Humbug (Norwegian Title)

Credits 

 Produced and Directed by: Tom Burton and Claudia Zeitlin Burton
 Pre and Post Production Supervisor: Paul Vitello
 The Mr. Bogus Show Created by: Peter Keefe
 Original Character of Bogus Created by: Ghislain Honore and Michel Durieux
 Art Direction: Ken Leonard
 Production Design: Nestor P. Redondo, Dan E. Chessher
 Supervising Director: Mary Burton-Towner
 Storyboard Supervisor: Gary Goldstein
 Assistant Storyboard Supervisor: David Miller
 Storyboards: Bob Arkwright, Michael V. Bennett, Tom Bernardo, Robin O. Brigstoke, Curtis Cim, Victor A. Cook, Adrian Gonzales, Cullen Blaine Houghtaling, Michael Hulme, Chantal Itkin, Ken Laramay, Bob Lizarraga, Job C. Martin, Kenny McGill, Keith Sargent, Robert E. Steele Jr., Keith Tucker, Richard T. Walsh
 Voice Characterization Actors: Cam Clarke as Mr. Bogus, Tress MacNeille, Jeannie Elias, Pat Fraley, Neil Ross, Jim Cummings, Brian Cummings, Russi Taylor
 Music by: Dale Schacker
 Scene Planning: Curtis Cim
 Layout Supervisor: Tom Knowles
 Layout: Armando Norte, Enzo Baldi, Hee-Ja Cho, Yung Soo Kim, Jennifer A. McChristian, Won Ki Cho, Shawn Murphy, Dean Thompson
 Design: Won Ki Cho, Alan B. Huck, Hee-Ja Cho, Ric Quiroz, Tom Burton
 Background Styling Supervisor: David McBride
 Assistant Background Styling Supervisor: George W. Stokes
 Background Styling: Helle Hane, Janet Kusnick, Glen Peter Tarnowski, Steven Butz, Gregory Miller, David Harrington
 Animation Supervisor: Burton Medall
 Animation: Todd Hoff
 Graphic Animation Design Supervisor: Joel Fajnor
 Graphic Animation Design: Kim Pettijohn
 Animation Direction: Burton Medall, Emory (Ron) Myrick
 Ink and Paint Supervisor: Ashley Shurl Lupin
 Ink and Paint: Elena Marie Cox, Sybil E. Cuzzort, Gail L. Fiala, Tracey Oakley, Marie Boughamer
 Cel Xerography: Dean Stanley
 Storyboard Timing: Bob Arkwright, Emory (Ron) Myrick, Mary Burton-Towner
 Film Post Production Supervisor: Larry Whelan
 Supervising Editor: Franklin Cofod
 Film Editing: Jim Blodgett, Janet "Lime" Leimenstoll, Robert C. DeSales, Ethan Andrew Morgan
 Camera and Optical Effects Supervisor: Nancy Ketelsen
 Camera and Optical Effects: Roncie Hantke, John Lindahl, Drew Redford, Ken Yaecker
 Track Reading: Thomas W. Anderson
 Telecine Colorist: Trent Johnson
 Stereo Sound Post Production: Vitello & Associates, Inc.
 Post Production Coordinator: Darragh O'Farrell
 Supervising Sound Editor: R.D. Floyd
 Sound Editors: Steve Nelson, Cathy Malkasian, Ken Stange, Jim Christie
 Foley Artist: Ossama Khuluki
 Re-Recording Mixer: Mike Beiriger
 Dialogue Recording: Sound Services, Inc.
 Engineer: Gary Little
 Music Dyaxis Programmer: Jim Baldree
 Music Scoring Engineer: Mark Shifman
 Video Tape Editor: Trent Johnson
 Video Post Production Facility: Complete Post, Inc., Hollywood CA.
 Production Checking: Mimi Frances Clayton, Kathleen Irvine Evans
 Production Accounting: D. Douglas Hill, Janet Mann, June Burton, Shaunee Trish Keough
 Assistants to the Producers: Theresa Calderon, Diane DeLaurentis
 Production Assistants: Martin James Pratti, Melissa Savlov, Deannie Gallegos, Bruce T. Miyake
 Electronic Graphics: Barbara Doutt, Chris Moore, Melody Galyardt-Welch
 Animation Production Supervisor: Jack Heiter
 Animation Produced by: Heiter/Lee Productions
 With: Da Vinci Animation Korea
 Production Directors: Jack Heiter & Ji Hyun Hwang
 Production Coordinator: Hae Jung Lee Heiter
 Animation Directors: Ji Hyun Hwang, Ok Mo Lee, Ki Hong Jung
 Animators: Kyoung Bae Lee, Myoung Gil Jang, Sun Joo Kim, Gee Dong Lee, Sung Sook Lee, Yong Nam An, Youn Gon O, Kyoung Suk Hwang, Hyun Ha Jin, So Ho Jang
 Layout: Chung Sung Kim, Ji Yeong Kim, Choon Baek Yi, Bong Hwan Joo, Sung Young Lee
 Background Artists: Jong Young Lee, Hyong Hak Han, Soo Im Chung
 Production Managers: Kwan Sang Kwan, Hee Ok Back, Nam Sik Lee, Young Mokang
 Assistant Animators: Yeon Bock Lee, Myoung Ja La, Kyoung Mee Pak, Jong Phil Won, Jung Mi Kim, Sung Hae Hong, Hae Ja Lee, Young Gue Song, Bock Ja Kim, Hyun Sook Hong, Myoung Hee Kim
 Ink and Paint: Myoung Hwa Lee, Aei Kyoung Im
 Special Effects: Nam Young Kim
 Camera: Hana Camera Service
 Story Editor: Peter Keefe
 Creative Consultant: Mary Strauser
 Assistant to the Executive Producer: Thresa Katz
 Executive in Charge for Calico: Lee Mann
 Executive Producer: Peter Keefe
 Produced in Association with: Y.C. Aligator Film
 Copyright: ©Copyright 1991 Zodiac Entertainment, Inc.

References

External links 

1991 American television series debuts
1993 American television series endings
1990s American animated television series
American stop-motion animated television series
American children's animated comedy television series